Andrey Igorevich Afanasyev (born 15 May 1964) is a Russian association football coach and a former player. He is an assistant coach with FC Tom Tomsk.

Honours
 Russian Premier League bronze: 1995.
 Russian Cup winner: 1993.
 Soviet Cup runner-up: 1991.

International career
Born in Moscow, Afanasyev made his debut for Russia on 13 February 1993 in a friendly against the United States.

References

External links
  Profile

1964 births
Living people
Soviet footballers
Russian footballers
Russia international footballers
Russian expatriate footballers
Expatriate footballers in Uzbekistan
PFC CSKA Moscow players
FC Torpedo Moscow players
FC Torpedo-2 players
Soviet Top League players
Russian Premier League players
FC Spartak Moscow players
FC Saturn Ramenskoye players
Russian football managers
FC Lokomotiv Nizhny Novgorod players
Navbahor Namangan players
Footballers from Moscow
Association football midfielders
Association football defenders